Le roi et le fermier is a 1762 opéra-comique in 3 acts by Pierre-Alexandre Monsigny to a libretto by Michel-Jean Sedaine.

Recording
Opera Lafayette

References

Operas
1762 operas
French-language operas